ESCM (initialism for Electric Sky Church Music) is the second studio album by American electronic musician BT, released on September 22, 1997. Following Ima, Transeau branched out to create club anthems such as "Flaming June", while also drawing inspiration from drum and bass as well as hip hop. ESCM also features Transeau adding live guitar, bass and drums to songs, as well as the use of a strings ensemble.

Background and recording
Following Ima, Transeau branched out to create club anthems such as "Flaming June", while also drawing inspiration from drum and bass as well as hip hop. ESCM also features Transeau adding live guitar, bass and drums to songs, as well as the use of a strings ensemble.

The majority of the album was produced and mixed by Transeau at Blue House on a Hill Studios, with the exception of string recordings that were done at Abbey Road Studios in London. "Solar Plexus" was recorded partially at Omega Studios in Rockville, Maryland.

Amongst the tracks recorded during the sessions but left unreleased were the track "Lemon Balm and Chamomile", written with Che Malcolm, and "Flesh", written with Jan Johnston. The latter track would later be remixed for a single release by Johnston in 2001.

Release
The album was released on 22 September 1997 and supported by three singles; "Flaming June", "Remember", and "Love, Peace and Grease", all of which charted in the UK.

Like Ima, ESCM was also mixed to sound like one continuous mix. For US pressings, the loungy drum and bass track "The Road to Lostwithiel" was replaced with the more straightforward "Lullaby for Gaia". Both songs were later made available, in unmixed form, on the retrospect album, 10 Years in the Life. The US pressing also features an edited version of "Love, Peace, and Grease".

The cover of the album and its singles feature an interpretation of a Monolith from Stanley Kubrick's 2001: A Space Odyssey.

Track listing

Personnel
Simon Hale – strings arrangement on "Firewater", "The Road to Lostwithiel" and "Remember"
Thomas Henry Culhane, Ph.D. – vocals on first half of "Firewater" and on "Memories in a Sea of Forgetfulness"
Paul van Dyk – additional production on "Flaming June"
Jan Johnston – vocals on "Lullaby for Gaia" and "Remember"
Vini Reilly – flamenco guitar on "Remember"
BT – all other vocals, instruments and programming

Charts

References

External links

1997 albums
BT (musician) albums
Reprise Records albums
House music albums by American artists